The 1958–1959 St. Francis Terriers men's basketball team represented St. Francis College during the 1958–59 NCAA University Division men's basketball season. The team was coached by Daniel Lynch, who was in his eleventh year at the helm of the St. Francis Terriers. The team was a member of the Metropolitan New York Conference and played their home games at the II Corps Artillery Armory in Park Slope, Brooklyn.

The Terriers finished their season at 14–9 overall and 2–1 in conference play.

Roster

Schedule and results

|-
!colspan=12 style="background:#0038A8; border: 2px solid #CE1126;;color:#FFFFFF;"| Regular Season

References

External links
 St. Francis Terriers men's basketball official website

St. Francis Brooklyn Terriers men's basketball seasons
St. Francis
Saint Francis
Saint Francis